12th NYFCO Awards
December 9, 2011

Best Film:
Zero Dark Thirty

The 12th New York Film Critics Online Awards, honoring the best in filmmaking in 2012, were given on December 9, 2012.

Winners
Best Actor:
Daniel Day-Lewis – Lincoln
Best Actress:
Emmanuelle Riva – Amour
Best Animated Film:
Chico and Rita
Best Cast:
Argo
Best Cinematography:
Life of Pi – Claudio Miranda
Best Debut Director:
Benh Zeitlin – Beasts of the Southern Wild
Best Director:
Kathryn Bigelow – Zero Dark Thirty
Best Documentary Film:
The Central Park Five
Best Film:
Zero Dark Thirty
Best Film Music or Score:
Django Unchained – Various Artists
Best Foreign Language Film:
Amour • France
Best Screenplay:
Zero Dark Thirty – Mark Boal
Best Supporting Actor:
Tommy Lee Jones – Lincoln
Best Supporting Actress:
Anne Hathaway – Les Misérables
Breakthrough Performer:
Quvenzhané Wallis – Beasts of the Southern Wild

NYFCO Best Films of 2012
 Argo
 Beasts of the Southern Wild
 Django Unchained
 Les Misérables
 Life of Pi
 Lincoln
 The Master
 Moonrise Kingdom
 Silver Linings Playbook
 Zero Dark Thirty

References

New York Film Critics Online Awards
2012 film awards